This page documents all U.S. tornadoes confirmed in 1952. Due to lack of modern radar and storm spotters, tornado counts from this period are much lower than what we see today.

United States yearly total

January

January 17 event

January 22 event

January 26 event

January 28 event

February

February 1 event

February 13 event

February 19 event

February 20 event

February 26 event

February 29 event

March

March 2 event

March 3 event

March 10 event

March 13 event

March 17 event

March 18 event

March 21 event

March 22 event

April

April 3 event

April 4 event

April 5 event

April 8 event

April 13 event

April 18 event

April 20 event

April 21 event

April 22 event

April 23 event

April 29 event

April 30 event

May

May 6 event

May 7 event

May 8 event

May 9 event

May 10 event

May 11 event

May 13 event

May 15 event

May 19 event

May 20 event

May 21 event

May 22 event

May 23 event

May 24 event

May 26 event

May 30 event

June

There were 34 tornadoes confirmed in the US in June.

June 23 event

June 24 event

July

There were 27 tornadoes confirmed in the US in July.

August

There were 16 tornadoes confirmed in the US in August.

September

September 17 event

October

November

November 14 event

November 16 event

November 17 event

November 19 event

December

December 3 event

December 9 event

December 20 event

See also
Tornadoes of 1952
List of North American tornadoes and tornado outbreaks

Notes

References

Bibliography
 
 

1952
Tornadoes of 1952
Tornadoes
Tornadoes, United States
1952